The Williamson County Jail, or Old Williamson County Jail, is a historic building in Georgetown, Texas, United States. It is part of the Williamson County Courthouse Historic District, and has been designated a Recorded Texas Historic Landmark.

See also
 List of Recorded Texas Historic Landmarks (Trinity-Zavala)

References

External links

 

Buildings and structures in Georgetown, Texas